Space Needle may refer to:

 Space Needle, Seattle, Washington
 Gatlinburg Space Needle, Gatlinburg, Tennessee
 Space Needle (band)